Charles Isambart de Médine (Butot, 3 March 1736 — Le Bois-Robert, 16 December 1819) was a French Navy officer. He served in the War of American Independence.

Biography 
Médine was born to a noble family. He joined the Navy as a Garde-Marine on 4 July 1754. He was promoted to Lieutenant on 18 August 1767, and to Captain on 13 March 1779.

In 1780, he was the flag captain of Admiral Ternay d'Arsac on the 80-gun Duc de Bourgogne.

Médine took part in the Battle of Cape Henry on 16 March 1781, captaining the 74-gun Neptune. He was wounded in the engagement.

In January or February of 1782, he was given command of the 50-gun Experiment. He captained her at the Battle of Saint Kitts on 25 January 1782. He later commanded the 64-gun Réfléchi at the Battle of the Saintes on 12 April 1782.

He was one of the French founding members of the Society of Cincinnati.

By 1786, he was one of the chefs de division of the French Navy.

Citations and references 
Citations

References
 
 

Ludovic de Contenson, La Société des Cincinnati de France et la guerre d'Amérique (1778-1783), A. Picard, 1934

External links
 

1736 births
1819 deaths
French Navy officers